The 2017–18 Southern Counties East Football League season was the 52nd in the history of the Southern Counties East Football League, a football competition in England, and was the second year the competition has two divisions, the Premier Division and Division One.

The constitution for Step 5 and Step 6 divisions for 2017–18 was announced on 26 May 2017.

Premier Division

The Premier Division consisted of 17 clubs from the previous season along with three new clubs:
 Chatham Town, relegated from the Isthmian League
 Glebe, promoted from Division One
 Rusthall, promoted from Division One

League table

Results

Top scorers

Division One

Division One consisted of 16 clubs from the previous season along with three new clubs:
 Erith & Belvedere, relegated from the Premier Division
 Fisher, relegated from the Premier Division
 Punjab United, promoted from the Kent County League

Also, Eltham Palace changed their name to Stansfeld.

League table

Results

Top scorers

References

External links
 Southern Counties East Football League Official Website

2017–18
9